Bradley may refer to the following places in the U.S. state of Wisconsin:
Bradley, Wisconsin, a town in Lincoln County
Bradley (community), Lincoln County, Wisconsin, an unincorporated community in Lincoln County
Bradley, Marathon County, Wisconsin, an unincorporated community in Marathon County